Zhang Lirong (born 3 March 1973) is a retired Chinese runner. A dynamic middle and long distance runner, she set world class times in events ranging from the 1500m all the way up the marathon. She won the bronze medal in the 3000 m at the 1993 World Championships in Stuttgart.

Achievements

Personal bests

See also
China at the World Championships in Athletics

External links

1973 births
Living people
Chinese female middle-distance runners
Chinese female long-distance runners
Asian Games medalists in athletics (track and field)
World Athletics Championships medalists
Asian Games silver medalists for China
Medalists at the 1994 Asian Games
Athletes (track and field) at the 1994 Asian Games